John Reynolds (1797 – 21 August 1868) was an Irish Repeal Association politician who was a Westminster M.P. for Dublin City from the 1847 election to the 1852 election, and Lord Mayor of Dublin in 1850. He was from a prosperous family; in the 1840s he was secretary of the National Bank of Ireland, while his brother Thomas Reynolds was Dublin City Marshal.

Reynolds regarded the Repeal Association as a vehicle for advancing the local interest of Dublin rather than the constitutional question of repeal of the Acts of Union 1800. The Dublin merchant and trade lobby lost influence in the Association to professional men in the mid 1840s, but regained it after Daniel O'Connell's death in May 1847, with Reynolds, then an alderman, coming to prominence.  According to Charles Gavan Duffy, it was proved that Reynolds "accepted money extracted from officers for whom he had procured compensation in Parliament".  His grave is in Glasnevin Cemetery.

References

Citations

Sources
 
 

UK MPs 1847–1852
Lord Mayors of Dublin
Irish bankers
1797 births
1868 deaths
Burials at Glasnevin Cemetery
Members of the Parliament of the United Kingdom for County Dublin constituencies (1801–1922)
Irish Repeal Association MPs
19th-century Irish businesspeople